The Monument to Eugenio d'Ors Rovira is an instance of public art in Madrid, Spain. Dedicated to Eugenio d'Ors—noted Catalan writer, art critic and Francoist intellectual—it consists of a sculptural group put inside a fountain and a commemorative wall displaying a relief of d'Ors. It lies at the middle of the Paseo del Prado, facing both the Casa Sindical and the Prado Museum.

History and description 
The front side of the monument facing the Prado Museum displays a bronze sculptural group emerging from a fountain; it consists of a female allegory (designed by ) stopping a four-legged creature variously described as a "small dragon", a "pet stegosaurus" or a "baroque and spontaneous eruption". 

The granite wall features a long inscription, with a compilation of aphorisms summarising the opinions of the honoured author on Life and Aesthetics.

Madrid dedicates this fountain in 1963 being mayor the 16th Count of Mayalde).

It was unveiled in July 1963.

References 
Citations

Bibliography
 
 
 

Monuments and memorials in Madrid
Buildings and structures in Cortes neighborhood, Madrid
Bronze sculptures in Spain
Outdoor sculptures in Madrid
Fountains in Madrid
Paseo del Prado